In chemistry, a corrosion inhibitor or anti-corrosive is a chemical compound that, when added to a liquid or gas, decreases the corrosion rate of a material, typically a metal or an alloy, that comes into contact with the fluid. The effectiveness of a corrosion inhibitor depends on fluid composition, quantity of water, and flow regime. Corrosion inhibitors are common in industry, and also found in over-the-counter products, typically in spray form in combination with a lubricant and sometimes a penetrating oil. They may be added to water to prevent leaching of lead or copper from pipes.

A common mechanism for inhibiting corrosion involves formation of a coating, often a passivation layer, which prevents access of the corrosive substance to the metal. Permanent treatments such as chrome plating are not generally considered inhibitors, however: corrosion inhibitors are additives to the fluids that surround the metal or related object.

Types

The nature of the corrosive inhibitor depends on (i) the material being protected, which are most commonly metal objects, and (ii) on the corrosive agent(s) to be neutralized. The corrosive agents are generally oxygen, hydrogen sulfide, and carbon dioxide. Oxygen is generally removed by reductive inhibitors such as amines and hydrazines:
O2 + N2H4 -> 2 H2O + N2
In this example, hydrazine converts oxygen, a common corrosive agent, to water, which is generally benign. Related inhibitors of oxygen corrosion are hexamine, phenylenediamine, and dimethylethanolamine, and their derivatives. Antioxidants such as sulfite and ascorbic acid are sometimes used. Some corrosion inhibitors form a passivating coating on the surface by chemisorption. Benzotriazole is one such species used to protect copper. For lubrication, zinc dithiophosphates are common - they deposit sulfide on surfaces.

The suitability of any given chemical for a task in hand depends on many factors, including their operating temperature.

Illustrative applications
Volatile amines are used in boilers to minimize the effects of acid. In some cases, the amines form a protective film on the steel surface and, at the same time, act as an anodic inhibitor. An inhibitor that acts both in a cathodic and anodic manner is termed a mixed inhibitor.
Benzotriazole inhibits the corrosion and staining of copper surfaces.
Corrosion inhibitors are often added to paints. A pigment with anticorrosive properties is zinc phosphate. Compounds derived from tannic acid or zinc salts of organonitrogens (e.g. Alcophor 827) can be used together with anticorrosive pigments. Other corrosion inhibitors are Anticor 70, Albaex, Ferrophos, and Molywhite MZAP.
Antiseptics are used to counter microbial corrosion. Benzalkonium chloride is commonly used in oil field industry.
In oil refineries, hydrogen sulfide can corrode steels so it is removed often using air and amines by conversion to polysulfides.
Orthophosphates may be added in water treatment systems to prevent leaching of lead and copper from pipes.

Fuels industry
Corrosion inhibitors are commonly added to coolants, fuels, hydraulic fluids, boiler water, engine oil, and many other fluids used in industry. For fuels, various corrosion inhibitors can be used. Some components include zinc dithiophosphates.
 DCI-4A, widely used in commercial and military jet fuels, acts also as a lubricity additive. Can be also used for gasolines and other distillate fuels.
 DCI-6A, for motor gasoline and distillate fuels, and for U.S. military fuels (JP-4, JP-5, JP-8)
 DCI-11, for alcohols and gasolines containing oxygenates
 DCI-28, for very low-pH alcohols and gasolines containing oxygenates
 DCI-30, for gasoline and distillate fuels, excellent for pipeline transfers and storage, caustic-resistant
 DMA-4 (solution of alkylaminophosphate in kerosene), for petroleum distillates

See also

Useful websites

*

References

External links 
Corrosion control informations and documents
Developing corrosion inhibitor models – A paper on corrosion inhibition modeling
Corrosion inhibition, Norman Hackerman,(August, 2006), Electrochemistry Encyclopedia

Corrosion prevention
Lubricants
Oil additives
Process chemicals
 
Conservation and restoration of cultural heritage
Concrete admixtures